Riona Hazuki (葉月里緒奈 Hazuki Riona), born Mai Yamada (山田麻衣 Yamada Mai, born on July 11, 1975 in Tokyo, Japan), is a Japanese actress. In 1999, she played the main role in Owls' Castle.

Selected filmography

 Sharaku (1995)
 Kuro no Tenshi (1997)
 Parasite Eve (1997)
 Owls' Castle (1999)
 Retribution (2006)
 BOX: The Hakamada Case (2010)

External links
 

1975 births
Living people
Japanese female adult models
20th-century Japanese actresses